Tomorrow is Ours (French: Demain nous appartient) is a French television soap opera created by Frédéric Chansel, Laure de Colbert, Nicolas Durand-Zouky, Éline Le Fur, Fabienne Lesieur and Jean-Marc Taba. It was first broadcast on TF1 on July 17, 2017.

Cast

Main cast 
The opening titles change regularly to feature the characters involved in the current storylines.

Notable recurring cast 
These characters have appeared in at least 100 episodes:

Episodes

References

External links
  
 

French television soap operas
2017 French television series debuts
2010s French television series
2020s French television series
TF1 television dramas
French police procedural television series
Television series about families
Television shows set in France
French-language television shows